John Arnot may refer to:

John Arnot Jr. (1831–1886), American politician
John Arnot, prisoner on the St. Michael of Scarborough
Sir John Arnot (1530–1616) of Berswick, twice Lord Provost of Edinburgh
Sir John Arnot, 3rd Baronet (died 1750) of the Arnot baronets
Sir John Arnot, 4th Baronet (died  1762) of the Arnot baronets
Sir John Arnot, 5th Baronet (died c. 1765) of the Arnot baronets

See also
John Arnott (disambiguation)
Arnot (disambiguation)